Alder Creek is a hamlet in Oneida County, New York, United States. Alder Creek has a post office with ZIP code 13301.

Notable person
 Mary Traffarn Whitney (1852–1942), minister, editor, social reformer, philanthropist, lecturer

References

Hamlets in Oneida County, New York
Hamlets in New York (state)